This is a list of notable Azerbaijani actors, which is arranged alphabetically.

A 
 Lutfali Abdullayev
 Telman Adigozalov
 Ahmed Agdamski
 Alasgar Alakbarov
 Mirzaagha Aliyev
 Huseyn Arablinski

B 
 Mirza Babayev
 Shamsi Badalbeyli
 Rasim Balayev
 Afag Bashirgyzy
 Rashid Behbudov
 Polad Bülbüloğlu

D 
 Marziyya Davudova

G 
 Fatma Gadri
 Aghasadyg Garaybeyli
 Govhar Gaziyeva

H 
 Alakbar Huseynov

K 
 Munavvar Kalantarli
 Zulfiyya Khanbabayeva

M 
 Fakhraddin Manafov
 Elchin Musaoglu

O 
 Hamida Omarova

R 
 Ulvi Rajab
 Hagigat Rzayeva

S 
 Latif Safarov
 Huseyngulu Sarabski
 Barat Shakinskaya
 Abbas Mirza Sharifzadeh

T 
 Rza Tahmasib
 Jahan Talyshinskaya
 Pamphylia Tanailidi
 Hasanagha Turabov

Z 
 Nasiba Zeynalova

See also 

 Lists of actors
 List of Azerbaijani film directors
 List of Azerbaijani film producers
 List of Azerbaijanis

 
Lists of actors by nationality
Actors